Moșna is a commune in Iași County, Western Moldavia, Romania. It is composed of a single village, Moșna.

References

Communes in Iași County
Localities in Western Moldavia